The 1856 Last Island hurricane (also known as the Great Storm of 1856) was a deadly and destructive tropical cyclone that is tied with 2020's Hurricane Laura and 2021's Hurricane Ida as the strongest hurricane on record to make landfall in the U.S. state of Louisiana, as measured by maximum sustained winds. The first known tropical cyclone of 1856 Atlantic hurricane season, it was observed first as a minimal hurricane in the Gulf of Mexico near Dry Tortugas on August 9. Moving northwestward, the cyclone quickly intensified into a strong Category 4 hurricane on the modern-day Saffir–Simpson scale by the following day. The system rapidly weakened after moving inland, falling to tropical storm intensity on August 11. The storm would be last noted over Mississippi on the next day.

Offshore, at least 183 people drowned after steamers and schooners sank in rough seas produced by the hurricane. A storm surge between  completely submerged Last Island in Louisiana, destroying virtually every structure, including the hotels and casinos, while all crops were ruined. Additionally, Last Island itself was split in two. Inland, heavy rainfall caused the Mermentau River to flood, destroying crops and every house in Abbeville. In Plaquemines Parish, rice fields were under several feet of water, while many orange trees lost their fruit. Overall, the hurricane resulted in at least 300 fatalities.

Meteorological history

Because it was already a hurricane when it was first observed, it probably had developed further east than here. It advanced steadily northwest, strengthening to the equivalent of a Category 3 hurricane. It was a tropical cyclone of small diameter, and its maximum sustained winds may have reached Category 5 status, but were unrecorded. During the early evening of August 10 the northeastern edge of the eye crossed over Last Island (Official name: Isle Dernière) before making landfall a few hours later south of New Iberia, Louisiana. It quickly weakened over land, and it diminished to a tropical storm on August 11. It dissipated over southwestern Mississippi on August 12 with fully tropical characteristics.

Impact and aftermath

Last Island

Many vacationers hoping to escape were awaiting the scheduled arrival of the ship Star, which provided regular service to the mainland. However, the Star was blown off course, barely escaping sailing into the open gulf, directly into the hurricane, where it would have almost certainly been lost. Passenger Tom Ellis, an experienced captain in local waters, and a few other passengers observed the ship was off course. Ellis alerted Captain Abe Smith, who corrected the course and barely making headway against the winds, managed to pull into the channel behind the hotel. The Star was swept, crashing into shore and beached on the sand, where it stayed through the storm.

Visibility during the storm was extremely limited and eyes were blasted by sand until water covered the beaches. Sometime between 4:00 and 5:00 PM the storm surge occurred suddenly, with the water rising several feet in a matter of minutes. The storm surge submerged the entire island and destroyed all of the buildings. The hotel, which held many women and children on the second floor and men on the first, collapsed, crushing many and sweeping others out to sea.

Several survivors managed to make their way to the hull of the Star. By tying himself with a rope to the Star, Captain Abe Smith was able to rescue at least 40 people from the storm surge.  The Star would serve as a shelter for the survivors until rescuers arrived three days later.

Many managed to survive by sheltering in or behind overturned cisterns, which were large wooden cylindrical tanks reinforced with iron hoops. Some clung to the raised foundations of the cisterns and a few to trees. A dozen people survived by clinging to a large piece of rotating playground equipment atop a levee.  Many people floated on debris, including wall sections, logs and furniture. A sturdy wooden enclosure that held large terrapins, a regional delicacy, provided enough protection to save several individuals. Another group survived by burying their feet in the sand and holding hands. Some survivors were carried to the marshes on the mainland, although some perished from injuries or lack of food and water.

Of the approximately 400 vacationers on the island, 198 were known or presumed dead and 203 were known survivors. Dixon (2009) provides lists of survivors and the dead.

Several of the victims were enslaved people. Some of the enslaved people were credited with rescuing others, including several children.

The tragedy had a major impact on the planter society, which lost many members. At the time of the hurricane approximately two-thirds of the millionaires in the U.S. lived in Louisiana, many of those being plantation owners, especially sugar growers. Of the social group affected, many were friends, acquaintances, or related by marriage or known through business.

The family home of three of the Last Island casualties was Shadows-on-the-Teche in New Iberia, Louisiana, now a National Historic Landmark. Mrs. Frances Weeks (Magill) Pruett and her children Mary Ida Magill and Augustine Magill died in the natural disaster. The two children were buried in the plantation's cemetery.

The island itself was split into the Last Islands (Isles Dernieres). The island reportedly stayed submerged for several days before parts of it re-emerged as large sandbars. After the storm surge, the remains of the Star were the only sign that an island had ever existed there.  Presently, the area is the Isles Dernieres Barrier Islands Refuge owned and managed by the Louisiana Department of Wildlife and Fisheries to provide protected nesting grounds for pelicans and other waterbirds.

Elsewhere
The following are the numbers of deaths offshore:
Steamer Nautilus: 85
Steamer Manilla: 13
Schooner Ellen: 15
Other losses at sea: 20

On Calliou Island, which was located near Last Island, four homes were destroyed and the others suffered substantial damage. Tides generated by the storm capsized two boats and swept away stock. Every building in Abbeville was destroyed, including St. Mary Magdalen Church. Crops along the Mermentau River suffered large losses from freshwater flooding. Farther east, storm surge and abnormally high tides left some sections of Plaquemines Parish inundated by several feet of water, resulting in a near-total loss of rice crops. Severe losses to orange crops were reported in the area. Extensive damage occurred in St. Tammany Parish at Lewisburg, Mandeville, and other areas near the Tchefuncte River. The storm swept away bathhouses and wharves, while also downing fences, trees, and vegetation.

In print
The disaster became national news as soon as three survivors salvaged a small boat and sailed to the mainland for help.

In addition to the several first hand accounts, the story of Last Island has been republished periodically. The list below includes only a few versions:

In 1871 Harper's New Monthly had a story about the capsizing of the steamer Nautilus and Jim Frisbee, the ship's second steward, the only survivor.
Lafcadio Hearn's novel Chita: A Memory of Last Island (1889), based on the Last Island hurricane of 1856, was a popular story when published; however, it either created or perpetuated several myths about the tragedy. One of the main sources of Hearn's novel was identified as the account written by Iberville Parish sugar planter Michael Shlatre. After publication of Chita, Michael Shlatre's document became lost after being borrowed and not returned. The document was recovered during 1936, when it was found in the Iberville Parish courthouse in Plaquemine, La.
Bill Dixon's Last Days of Last Island (2009) was written using information from various archives in an attempt to be historically accurate. The numerous references include a newspaper article, a few books, and accounts of the survivors, many of whom are quoted.

See also 

 List of Category 4 Atlantic hurricanes
 Last Island, Louisiana
 List of Atlantic hurricanes
 List of tropical cyclones

References
Notes

Bibliography

 Sallenger, Abby (2009) Island in a Storm: A Rising Sea, a Vanishing Coast, and a Nineteenth-Century Disaster that Warns of a Warmer World. New York: Public Affairs ,

External links
 NOLA.com article about the storm
 NOAA list of intense hurricanes
 Louisiana hurricane history
 Robert McAllister's eyewitness account
 The Deadliest Atlantic Tropical Cyclones, 1492–1996
 1856 account of the Hurricane
 Chita: A Memory of Lost Island, Lafcadio Hearn

August 1856 events
Last Island
Category 4 Atlantic hurricanes
Hurricanes in Louisiana
Last Island
Last Island
Abbeville, Louisiana
1856 in Louisiana
1856 meteorology